The Strickland-Herold House is a historic home in Miccosukee, Florida, United States. It is located at Main Street, northwest of junction of Moccasin Gap Road and State Road 59. On January 9, 1997, it was added to the U.S. National Register of Historic Places.

References

External links
 Leon County listings at National Register of Historic Places

Houses on the National Register of Historic Places in Florida
National Register of Historic Places in Leon County, Florida
Houses in Leon County, Florida